Senator Philip may refer to:

James "Scotty" Philip (1858–1911), South Dakota State Senate
James Philip (born 1930), Illinois State Senate

See also
Senator Phillips (disambiguation)